Bronx Theatre High School is a high school in New York City, on the border of the Marble Hill neighborhood of Manhattan and the Spuyten Duyvil neighborhood of the Bronx. It is currently a small school located within the John F. Kennedy High School building (99 Terrace View Avenue, 7th Floor, Bronx, NY 10463). The enrollment is about 435 students. A large proportion of these students are women, approximately 70%.

History
The school was opened in September 2003 under the leadership of Principal Debi Effinger in collaboration with the Roundabout Theater Company. The first freshman class entered with an estimated 100 kids. These students were the first graduating class of Bronx Theatre High School in the spring of 2007.

Curriculum
Along with required academic classes (Math, English, Science, and History), Bronx Theatre High School offers theatre arts classes such as acting, costume design, set design, and theatre business. All four of these arts classes work as an ensemble to put on a final production. The script used for the current production usually ties with the academic curriculum. In the students' history class, they study the time era of the text, and in English they have a chance to analyze the text to achieve a greater understanding of the story.

Past productions
The following are past productions performed at Bronx Theatre high School:

(2018-2019)
 Senior Ensemble
 "Black and Blue" By: Kevin Demoan Edwards and Katherine George
 Junior Ensemble
 "The Crucible" By: Arthur Miller
 Spring Musical
 Original Jukebox Musicals created by 11th and 12th Graders - "Locked in Love" and "Blinded by Love"

(2014-2015)
 Student written play "Dead of Night: A Cinderella Tragedy" by Lena Smith
 The Crucible
 In the Heights

(2013-2014)
 A Murder is Announced
 Chicago

(2007–2010)
Juniors
 Metamorphoses
 Ti-jean and his brothers Changed to Ti-jean and her brothers

(2006–2007)
 Seniors
 Studio 99 An Original Piece Directed by James Coles Assistant Director/Stage Manager Julia Rivera
Musical Theatre
Extraordinary: The First Musical An Original Piece Written by Anthony Colon
Juniors
 To Kill a Mockingbird
 The Laramie Project
 Freshmen
 Monkey Magic
 The Birds
 Marco Polo
 The Adventures of Harlequin

(2005–2006)
 Juniors
 The Crucible
 A Raisin in the Sun
 Sophomores

 Rising Star Cafe
 Freshmen

 1001 Arabian Nights
 Everyman
 Shakespears Clowns

(2004–2005)
 Sophomores
 A Midsummer Night's Dream
 O Brave New World (an adaptation of Brave New World, a book by Aldous Huxley)
 Freshmen
 Most Powerful JuJu
 Antigone
 Everyman
 Sir Gawain And The Loathly Lady

(2003–2004)
 Freshmen
 The Epic of and Enkidu Gilgamesh
 Oedipus Rex
 The Canterbury Tales
 Androcles and the Lion

General Information 
School Leader: Daniel Albetta, Principal

Parent Coordinator: Meighan Ackon, Zena Cordero

Space: Shares building with other schools

District Borough Number: 10X546

School Number: X546

Accessibility: Partially Accessible

Grades: 09,10,11,12,SE

Students: 340

Geographic District: 10

Borough: Bronx

The arts

Acting
Students of the acting class learn to trust each other and work as an ensemble towards one shared goal. They go through an extensive vocal and physical warm-up to prepare their bodies, an actors instrument, for their class. After the play has been cast, rehearsals begin. The students learn the art of telling a story with their bodies, blocking, and the proper way to move on a stage. Acting techniques and coaching are given by the acting teacher who is also the director of the production.

Costume design
Students of the costume design class first learn how to improve their sketching abilities of the human form and proportion. This enables them to present an effective design for the production. They research the style of clothing of the particular era the play is set in. After research, students are encouraged to create their own inspired designs from what they have seen. After the sketches are drawn and the play has been cast, a student or a group of students are assigned to one or more characters costumes. From there students learn pattern making and professional construction of a costume.

Set design
Students of the set design class first learn how to improve their sketching abilities of a certain space. They also learn the art of perspective and how to create realistic drawings. Doing this also enables them to draw or create models of the set based on their research of the time era. Each student has a hand in building the set and designing the look.

Theatre business
The students involved in theatre business are responsible for funding and promoting the production. Some students are in charge of marketing and the budget, others are in charge of poster design and presentation. The students are required to come up with ideas for the show's promotion and how to make money.

References 

Public high schools in the Bronx
Marble Hill, Manhattan
Spuyten Duyvil, Bronx